Rupal Glacier or Tashain Glacier is a glacier in the Great Himalaya subrange of Himalayas. It starts north of an unnamed  peak and flows northeastward, north of Laila Peak (Rupal Valley) and south of Nanga Parbat's many peaks. The meltwater from the glacier forms Rupal River.

See also
 List of glaciers

External links
 Northern Pakistan - highly detailed placemarks in Google Earth

Glaciers of Gilgit-Baltistan